Mezhozyorny is a rural locality (a settlement) in Starokucherganovsky Selsoviet, Narimanovsky District, Astrakhan Oblast, Russia. The population was 8 as of 2010.

Geography 
Mezhozyorny is located 48 km south of Narimanov (the district's administrative centre) by road. Trusovo is the nearest rural locality.

References 

Rural localities in Narimanovsky District